Cadence Design Systems, Inc. (stylized as cādence), headquartered in San Jose, California, is an American multinational computational software company, founded in 1988 by the merger of SDA Systems and ECAD, Inc. The company produces software, hardware, and silicon structures for designing integrated circuits, systems on chips (SoCs), and printed circuit boards.

History

Origins
Cadence Design Systems began as an electronic design automation (EDA) company, formed by the 1988 merger of Solomon Design Automation (SDA), co-founded in 1983 by Richard Newton, Alberto Sangiovanni-Vincentelli, and James Solomon, and ECAD, a public company co-founded by Ping Chao, Glen Antle, and Paul Huang in 1982. SDA's CEO Joseph Costello was appointed as CEO of the newly combined company.

Executive leadership
Following the resignation of Cadence's original CEO Joe Costello in 1997, Jack Harding was appointed CEO. Ray Bingham was named CEO in 1999. In 2004, Mike Fister became Cadence's new CEO.

In 2008, Cadence's board appointed Lip-Bu Tan as acting CEO, after the resignation of Mike Fister; Tan had served on the Cadence board of directors since 2004. In January 2009, the board of directors of Cadence voted unanimously to confirm Lip-Bu Tan as president and CEO. Tan had been most recently CEO of Walden International, a venture capital firm, where he remains chairman of the firm.

On December 15, 2021, Anirudh Devgan assumed the role of president & CEO, and Lip-Bu Tan became executive chairman. Devgan joined Cadence in 2012 and was appointed president in 2017.

Products
The company develops software, hardware and intellectual properties (IP) used to design chips, systems and printed circuit boards, as well as IP covering interfaces, memory, analog, SoC peripherals, data plane processing units, and verification.

Custom IC technologies
Virtuoso Platform. Tools for designing full-custom integrated circuits; includes schematic entry, behavioral modeling (Verilog-AMS), circuit simulation, custom layout, physical verification, extraction, and back-annotation. Used mainly for analog, mixed-signal, RF, and standard-cell designs, but also memory and FPGA designs.
Spectre X. In June 2019, Cadence introduced Spectre X parallel circuit simulator, so that users could distribute time- and frequency-domain simulations across hundreds of CPUs for faster runtime and speed.
AWR is a radio frequency to millimeter wave design environment for designing 5G/wireless products. Used for communications, aerospace and defense, semiconductor, computer, and consumer electronics.

Digital implementation and signoff technologies
Genus, Innovus, Tempus & Voltus.  In March 2020, Cadence announced that its Innovus place and route engine and optimizer were now integrated into Genus Synthesis, with both tools using a common user interface and database.
Stratus High-level synthesis tool that creates RTL implementations from C, C++, or SystemC code.
Cerebrus. In July 2021, Cadence announced its machine learning-based Cerebrus chip explorer product to automatically optimize the Cadence digital design flow for specified power, performance, and area goals across multiple blocks. Cerebrus utilizes a reinforcement learning approach to increase efficiency each time the optimization process is repeated.

Other Cadence RTL to GDS II tools: Conformal Equivalence Checker, Stratus High-Level Synthesis, Joules Power Analysis, Quantus RC Extraction, Modus AutomaticTest Pattern Generation.

Verification technologies
Xcelium. Xcelium is a parallel simulator, introduced in 2017, based on a multi-core parallel computing architecture.
JasperGold. JasperGold is a formal verification tool, initially introduced in 2003.  In 2019, Cadence announced new machine learning technology to automate JasperGold solver selection and parameterization to achieve faster first-time proofs; additionally to optimize regression runs.
Perspec System Verifier. Perspec was announced in 2014, for defining and verifying system-level verification scenarios, and then creating test cases to verify the scenarios using constraint-solving technology.  In mid-2018, Cadence announced that Perspec supported the new Accellera Portable Test and Stimulus Standard (PSS) standard.
.  is verification management tool for tracking verification process, including coverage, using emulation, simulation, and/or formal technology as the data source(s).
Palladium. In 2015, Cadence announced the Palladium Z1 Hardware emulation platform, with over 100 million gates per hour compile speed, and greater than 1 MHz execution for billion-gate designs.  Cadence's Palladium emulator was originally from Cadence's Quickturn acquisition in 1998. In 2021, Cadence announced Palladium Z2, claiming a 1.5X performance and 2X capacity improvement over the prior Palladium Z1, for more than 18 billion gate+ capacity. Additionally, Cadence claimed Palladium Z2 could compile 10 billion gates in under 10 hours.
Protium. The Protium FPGA prototyping platform was officially introduced in 2014.  In 2017, Cadence introduced the Protium S1 built on Xilinx Virtex UltraScale FPGAs. In 2019, Protium X1 rack-based prototyping was introduced, which Cadence claimed supported a 1.2 billion gate SoCs at around 5 MHz.  Palladium S1/X1 and Protium share a single compilation flow. In 2021, Protium X2 was announced; Cadence claimed a 1.5X performance and 2X capacity improvement over Protium X1, and that Protium X2 could compile 10 billion gates in under 24 hours.

Intellectual property
Design IP targeting areas including memory / storage / high-performance interface protocols (USB or PCIe controllers and PHYs), Tensilica DSP processors for audio, vision, wireless modems and convolutional neural nets. Tensilica DSP processors IP include:

Tensilica Vision DSPs for Imaging, Vision, and AI processing; Tensilica HiFi DSPs for Audio/Voice/Speech processing; Tensilica Fusion DSPs for IoT; Tensilica ConnX DSPs for Radar, Lidar, and Communications processing; and Tensilica DNA Processor Family for AI acceleration

In 2021, Cadence launched the Tensilica AI Platform to accelerate AI SoC development and improve power, performance and area—targeting mobile, IoT, automotive, intelligent sensor, and industrial AI SoC designs.

PCB and packaging technologies
Allegro Platform. Tools for co-design of integrated circuits, packages, and PCBs, including the Specctra auto-router.
OrCAD/PSpice. Tools for smaller design teams and individual PCB designers.
OrbitIO Interconnect Designer. Die/package planning & route optimization tool.
InspectAR.  InspectAR uses augmented reality to map out complicated circuit board electronics for real-time labelling of board schematics.

System analysis
Sigrity. Tools for signal, power integrity, and thermal integrity analysis and IC package design.
Clarity. Cadence introduced Clarity in April 2019, as part of its expansion into system analysis. Clarity is a 3D field solver for electromagnetic analysis, that uses distributed adaptive meshing to partition jobs across on hundreds of cores for gains in speed and capacity.
Celsius. In September 2019, Cadence announced Celsius, a parallel architecture thermal solver that uses finite element analysis for solid structures and computational fluid dynamics (CFD) for fluids.
Omnis. Omnis is a computational fluid dynamics, mesh generation, multi-physics simulation, and optimization product, with established applications in aerospace, automotive, industrial, and marine. (From NUMECA acquisition in 2021.)
Pointwise.  Pointwise computational fluid dynamics (CFD) mesh generation. (From Pointwise acquisition in 2021.)
Cascade Technologies, Inc. Hi-fidelity CFD solvers for multiphysics analysis of turbulence fluid flows.

Recognition

In 2016, Cadence CEO Lip-Bu Tan was awarded the Dr. Morris Chang Exemplary Leadership Award by the Global Semiconductor Alliance.

In 2019, Investor's Business Daily ranked Cadence Design Systems #5 on its 50 Best Environmental, Social, and Governance (ESG) Companies list.

In 2020, Fortune Magazine named Cadence to Fortune's "100 Best Companies to Work For list" for the sixth consecutive year.

Also in 2020, Cadence was ranked #45 in PEOPLE magazine's Companies that Care.

Sponsorship 
In May 2022, McLaren announced a multi-year partnership deal with Cadence.

Acquisitions

Timeline

The company has also acquired High-Level Design (HLD), UniCAD, CadMOS, Ambit Design Systems, Simplex, Silicon Perspective, Plato, and Get2Chip.

Related

In 2007, Cadence was rumored to be in talks with Kohlberg Kravis Roberts and Blackstone Group regarding a possible sale of the company.
In 2008, Cadence withdrew a $1.6 billion offer to purchase rival Mentor Graphics.

Lawsuits

Avanti Corporation    From 1995 until 2002, Cadence was involved in a 6-year-long legal dispute with Avanti Corporation (brand name "Avant!"), in which Cadence claimed Avanti stole Cadence code, and Avanti denied it.  According to Business Week "The Avanti case is probably the most dramatic tale of white-collar crime in the history of Silicon Valley".  The Avanti executives eventually pleaded no contest and Cadence received several hundred million dollars in restitution. Avanti was then purchased by Synopsys, which paid $265 million more to settle the remaining claims.  The case resulted in a number of legal precedents.
Aptix Corporation Quickturn Design Systems, a company acquired by Cadence, was involved in a series of legal events with Aptix Corporation. Aptix licensed a patent to Mentor Graphics and the two companies jointly sued Quickturn over an alleged patent infringement.  Amr Mohsen, CEO of Aptix, forged and tampered with legal evidence and was subsequently charged with conspiracy, perjury, and obstruction of justice. Mohsen was arrested after violating his bail agreement by attempting to flee the country. While in jail, Mohsen plotted to intimidate witnesses and kill the federal judge presiding over his case.  Mohsen was further charged with attempting to delay a federal trial by feigning incompetency. Due to the overwhelming misconduct, the judge ruled the lawsuit as unenforceable and Mohsen was sentenced to 17 years in prison. Mentor Graphics subsequently sued Aptix to recoup legal costs. Cadence also sued Mentor Graphics and Aptix to recover legal costs.
Berkeley Design Automation In 2013, Cadence sued Berkeley Design Automation (BDA) for circumvention of a license scheme to link its Analog FastSpice (AFS) simulator to Cadence's Analog Design Environment (Virtuoso ADE).  The lawsuit was settled less than one year later with an undisclosed payment of BDA and a multi-year agreement to support interoperability of AFS with ADE through Cadence's official interface. BDA was bought by Mentor Graphics a few months later.

Notable persons
Alberto Sangiovanni-Vincentelli, co-founder
Richard Newton, co-founder
James Solomon, co-founder
Ken Kundert, fellow. Creator of the Spectre circuit simulation family of products (including SpectreRF) and the Verilog-A analog hardware description language
Joseph Costello, CEO, 1988–1997
Lip-Bu Tan, CEO, 2009–2021
Anirudh Devgan, President 2017-2021, President and CEO, 2021–present 
Penny Herscher

See also 

List of EDA companies
Comparison of EDA software

References

External links 

Electronic design automation companies
Electronics companies of the United States
Software companies of the United States
Software companies based in the San Francisco Bay Area
Companies based in San Jose, California
American companies established in 1988
Electronics companies established in 1988
Software companies established in 1988
1988 establishments in California
Companies listed on the Nasdaq